Emacs Web Wowser (a backronym of "eww") is a lightweight web browser within the GNU Emacs text editor. Eww can only do basic rendering of HTML; there is no capability for executing JavaScript or handling the intricacies of CSS. It was developed by Lars Magne Ingebrigtsen, who also created the underlying HTML rendering library.

See also 
w3m used with emacs-w3m interface
Emacs/W3

References

External links 
 GNU Emacs manual
 Source code

Free web browsers
Emacs
Cross-platform free software
Free software programmed in Lisp
Software using the GPL license
Emacs modes